Interleukin-17 receptor B is a protein that in humans is encoded by the IL17RB gene.

The protein encoded by this gene is a cytokine receptor. This receptor specifically binds to IL17B and IL17E (IL25), but does not bind to IL17(A) or IL17C. This receptor has been shown to mediate the activation of NF-κB and the production of IL8 induced by IL17E. The expression of the rat counterpart of this gene was found to be significantly up-regulated during intestinal inflammation, which suggested the immunoregulatory activity of this receptor.

See also
 Interleukin-17 receptor

References

Further reading

External links
 

IL17 family cytokine receptors